The I-94 derecho was a progressive derecho that moved through the Upper Mississippi Valley on July 19, 1983. It is so called because the derecho moved through Minnesota and Wisconsin with I-94 as its axis. 

The derecho formed as an area of disturbed weather in eastern Montana moved eastward. It moved into northwestern North Dakota at around 7a.m. CDT forming a small bow echo.

Further development formed two and three bow echo segments as the storm moved into Minnesota. The winds damaged and destroyed hangars. It continued southeast and arrived at Minneapolis, Minnesota at around 4p.m. CDT and left 250,000 people without power.

Trees were blown over and buildings damaged as the derecho raced through Wisconsin. A meteorologist working at the University of Wisconsin–Madison saw the derecho approach from the southeastern shore of Lake Mendota near Madison, Wisconsin. On the university's campus, the windows were blown out of the second and third stories of the library. Tiles from the roof were blown off and landed several blocks to the southeast. The strong winds resulted in  waves on Lake Mendota.

The derecho started moving into northern Illinois at around 9p.m. CDT. National Weather Service meteorologist Richard Koeneman recorded observations in his weather diary, noting that the evening was "warm and humid", but that the temperature dropped  in 20 minutes ( from 9:30 to 9:50 as the derecho passed.

The derecho winds were still strong as it moved into northwestern side of Chicago. The derecho finally died out over northwestern Indiana at around midnight on July 20.

The storm was responsible for 34 injuries, including 12 from mobile homes being overturned and 8 from falling trees.

See also
List of derecho events

References

External links
NOAA Page on the I-94 Derecho

1983 meteorology
1983 natural disasters in the United States
Derechos in the United States
Natural disasters in Illinois
Natural disasters in Minnesota
Natural disasters in Wisconsin
July 1983 events in the United States